An election for the leadership of the Liberal Party of Australia took place on 11 March 1983, following the resignation of Malcolm Fraser following his defeat at the 1983 federal election. The contest was won by Andrew Peacock over John Howard by 36 votes to 20.

Background

Candidates
 John Howard, incumbent Deputy Leader, former Treasurer, Member for Bennelong
 Andrew Peacock, former Minister for Industry, Member for Kooyong

Results

The following tables gives the ballot results:

Leadership ballot

Deputy leadership ballot

Aftermath

See also
1983 Australian federal election

References

Liberal Party of Australia leadership spills
March 1983 events in Australia
1983 elections in Australia
Liberal Party of Australia leadership election